Rachel Simmons is an American author of the book Odd Girl Out: The Hidden Culture of Aggression in Girls published in 2002.

Background
Simmons graduated from Vassar College and was a Rhodes Scholar at Lincoln College, Oxford where she began studying female aggression. She is a native of Rockville, Maryland, her mother Claire is a Jewish historian and her father Luiz R. S. Simmons is an attorney and was a member of the Maryland General Assembly.

On September 1, 2009, Simmons was interviewed on NBC's The Today Show about her new book "The
Curse of the Good Girl". In March 2011, Rachel Simmons gave a speech about empowering girls to Qualters Middle School in Mansfield, Massachusetts to sixth and seventh grade girls.

On April 6, 2015, Simmons was the keynote speaker at the "Educating Girls:  Be Well, Lead Well" conference held in New York City and sponsored by the New York State Association of Independent Schools and the National Coalition of Girls Schools.

Simmons is the Girls Research Scholar in Residence at The Hewitt School in New York City.

Films
 Odd Girl Out was made into a TV film starring Alexa Vega.
 A Girl's Life, 2009

Writings
 Odd Girl Out: The Hidden Culture of Aggression in Girls. New York: Harcourt, 2002.  
 Odd Girl Speaks Out: Girls Write About Bullies, Cliques, Popularity, and Jealousy. Orlando, Fla: Harcourt, 2004. 
 The Curse of the Good Girl: Raising Authentic Girls with Courage and Confidence. New York: The Penguin Press, 2009. 
 Enough as She Is: How to Help Girls Move Beyond Impossible Standards of Success to Live Healthy, Happy, and Fulfilling Lives: New York: Harper, 2018                              
 Perfectionism among teens is rampant (and we’re not helping) Newspaper Article in the Washington Post, January 25, 2018

External links
Official Site

 Teenage Girls And Social Media: Tips For Parents From A Best-Selling Author, All Things Considered, August 8, 2011
 Rachel Simmons Video produced by Makers: Women Who Make America

References

1974 births
Alumni of Lincoln College, Oxford
Jewish American writers
American people of Brazilian-Jewish descent
American Rhodes Scholars
Vassar College alumni
Living people
American non-fiction writers
People from Rockville, Maryland
21st-century American Jews